The 1974 Virginia Slims of Denver  was a women's tennis tournament played on indoor carpet courts at the Denver Auditorium Arena  in Denver, Colorado in the United States that was part of the 1974 Virginia Slims World Championship Series. It was the third edition of the tournament and was held from September 23 through September 29, 1974. Third-seeded Evonne Goolagong won the singles title and earned $10,000 first-prize money.

Finals

Singles
 Evonne Goolagong defeated  Chris Evert 7–5, 3–6, 6–4
 It was Goolagong's 3rd title of the year and the 52nd of her career.

Doubles
 Françoise Dürr /  Betty Stöve defeated  Mona Schallau /  Pam Teeguarden 6–2, 7–5

Prize money

See also
 1974 United Bank Classic

References

Virginia Slims of Denver
Virginia Slims of Denver
Virgin
Virginia Slims of Denver
Virginia Slims of Denver